Dominion is the eleventh studio album by American Christian rock band Skillet. It was released on January 14, 2022, through Atlantic Records. The album was produced by Kane Churko, Kevin Churko, Michael O'Connor and Seth Mosley.

Background and promotion
On September 15, 2021, Skillet released the first single "Surviving the Game" along with an accompanying music video. At the same time, they announced the album itself, the album cover, the track list, and release date. On November 12, the band unveiled the second single "Standing in the Storm". On December 10, the third single "Refuge" was released. On January 7, 2022, one week before the album release, the band released the fourth and final single "Dominion".

Critical reception

Dominion received generally mixed to positive reviews from critics. Taylor Markarian from Blabbermouth.net gave the album 6.5 out of 10 and said: "Ultimately, just as there is a push and pull between oppressive and liberating forces in the theme of the record, there is tension between disjointed and cohesive elements in its sound and structure. While certain tracks are enjoyable individually, the fragmented parts don't add up to a satisfying whole." Jesus Freak Hideout rated the album 4 out of 5 and said: "In the end, as is made clear by this album's four-star rating, neither of these critiques seriously detract from the overall experience of Dominion. Cooper and company have delivered yet another album which is sure to please the present-day fans, and one which may even bring a few departed Panheads back into the fold." Louder Sound gave the album a mixed review and stated: "With Dominion, Skillet really are preaching to the converted. Ker-ching!"

Track listing

Personnel
Credits adapted from AllMusic.

Skillet
 John Cooper – lead vocals, bass, acoustic guitar
 Korey Cooper – rhythm guitar, keyboards, synthesizers, backing vocals
 Seth Morrison – lead guitar
 Jen Ledger – drums, backing and occasional lead vocals

Additional personnel
 Kane Churko – production, engineering, mixing
 Kevin Churko – production, engineering, mixing
 Michael O'Connor – production
 Seth Mosley – production
 Randy Slaugh – additional production, programming
 Ted Jensen – mastering
 Tristan Hardin and Pat Thrall – pro-tools

Charts

References

2022 albums
Skillet (band) albums